Mamadou Ouédraogo (1906 in Ouahigouya – 9 September 1978 in Ouahigouya) was a politician in the French Upper Volta.

One of the early leaders of the Voltaic Union, Ouédraogo represented Ouahigouyain in the Territorial Assembly from 1946 to 1952. From 1948 to 1956 he was a member of the National Assembly of France. He did not stand for reelection in 1956.

References

1906 births
1978 deaths
People from Nord Region (Burkina Faso)
People of French West Africa
Burkinabé politicians
Deputies of the 1st National Assembly of the French Fourth Republic
Deputies of the 2nd National Assembly of the French Fourth Republic